Ronnie Knight (born 20 January 1934) is an English convicted criminal and former nightclub owner.

On 4 January 1995, 16 days prior to his 61st birthday, Knight was sentenced to seven years imprisonment for handling £314,813 in stolen money from the 1983 £6m armed robbery at a Security Express depot in Shoreditch, East London.

Early life
Ronald Knight was born on 20 January 1934 in Hoxton, London Borough of Hackney, the son of James and Nellie.

Knight was responsible for minor infractions of the law when he was young, whereas his brothers John and James were involved in more significant crimes. Along with John, Knight was friendly with the Kray brothers, but, he says, was not connected with their illegal activities. Knight also had another brother, David and a sister, Patsy.

Clubs 
The two clubs Knight ran, the Artistes and Repertoire Club (known as the A&R) on Charing Cross Road and its neighbour Tin Pan Alley in Soho, London, were drinking establishments favoured by the criminal underworld.

Knight’s clubs were profitable, and he had a sideline in pool tables. He also made a small fortune from his share in peep-show clubs.

Criminal history

Zomparelli killing
In 1970, Knight’s brother, David, was stabbed to death in a pub in Islington by Alfredo "Italian Tony" Zomparelli, who himself was murdered in September 1974 after being released following a prison sentence for manslaughter. (Zomparelli had pleaded self-defence)

After hitman George Bradshaw confessed to his involvement, and alleged Knight had paid him £1,000 for the task, Knight was arrested for the murder of Zomparelli and tried at the Old Bailey in 1980; Knight was acquitted.

In his 1998 book, Memoirs and Confessions, Knight said he had hired a hitman, Nicky Gerard, to carry out the killing. (Gerard, who himself was later murdered, was acquitted at the same trial as Knight) in payback for the murder of his brother. Under the double jeopardy rules in force at the time, it meant he could not be tried a second time.

In 2002, Knight again denied responsibility.

Connection to 1983 Security Express robbery
Knight spent a decade on the run living in southern Spain's Costa del Sol, after fleeing on the night his brother was arrested in 1984 for a robbery at a Security Express depot the previous year. John Knight was later imprisoned for 22 years in June 1985 for co-arranging the robbery. Their other surviving brother James was among the other gang members along with Freddie Foreman and Cliford Saxe and received eight years for handling stolen money.

While evading extradition in Spain, Knight ran an Indian restaurant named Mumtaz and an eponymous nightclub, RKnights, the scene of violent crimes including a physical attack upon Knight, but by the mid-1990s, he was in financial difficulties.

After returning to Britain in May 1994, Knight, aged 60, was jailed for seven years in January 1995 for handling £314,813 in stolen money from the £6m armed robbery at a Security Express depot in Shoreditch, East London in 1983. Knight said he was not involved in the robbery, and the prosecution counsel Michael Worsley QC agreed the charge should remain on file, but Knight did plead guilty to handling the stolen bank notes. Judge Gerald Gordon said when sentencing Knight: "Clearly, I do not know what precise role you played. But professional robbers such as those involved are not going to hand over the sort of sums you got unless the person to whom they give it is very deeply involved himself".

In November 1998, Knight was released on parole after serving three years.

Other crimes
In 1961, Knight was sentenced to 15 months in prison for dealing in stolen goods.

Television 

In 2017, Knight was portrayed by Luke Allen-Gale in the BBC biopic documentary, Babs.

Personal life
Knight has been married three times and has two children.

 Elizabeth White (married in 1954, divorced before 1964)
 Barbara Windsor, actress (married 2 March 1964 in London, divorced January 1985)
 Sue Haylock (married in 1987 in Fuengirola, separated in 1994)
Knight has two children from his marriage to White, a daughter Lorraine (1956) and a son Garry (1959)

Knight has always denied he was a 'gangster', preferring instead the term 'loveable rascal'.

In 1995, it was reported Knight was in a relationship with Diane Lumley, they spilt around 2002.

As of 2017, Knight resides in Cambridge, England.

Selected publications
Knight has authored 6 books.

 Black Knight: The Ronnie Knight Story (1990)
 Signed Confessions (1996)
 Rod of Justice (1997)
 Memoirs and Confessions (1997)
 Gotcha!: The Untold Story of Britain’s Biggest Cash Robbery (2002)
 Blood and Revenge (2004)

References

External links
 Ronnie Knight interview

1934 births
Living people
20th-century English criminals
Criminals from London
English gangsters
Organised crime in London
English autobiographers
People acquitted of murder
People from Hoxton